The 1993 United States Interregional Soccer League was an American outdoor soccer season run by the United States Interregional Soccer League.

Southern Challenge Cup
In 1993, the league introduced the Southern Challenge Cup, a short season for teams which the league was considering for membership.  The cup would allow these provisional teams to test their organization before beginning a season long competitive schedule.  During the cup, the four provisional teams also played games against other teams in the league.  These games counted both in the USISL and Southern Challenge Cup standings.  The cup was capped by a final between the two top teams in which the Riverboat Gamblers defeated the Grasshoppers.

Final

Regular season

Scoring
The standings published by the USISL list only the wins, losses, goals scored, goals allowed and total points.  They do not provide the number of wins or losses that came through shootouts.  They also do not provide the number of bonus points coming from goals or corner kicks.

 Regulation win = 6 points
 Shootout win (SW) = 4 points
 Shootout loss (SL) = 2 points
 Regulation loss = 0 points
 Bonus points (BP): An additional one-point per goal up to a maximum of three points per game.
 Northeast Division and Midwest Division teams received one point per corner kick each game.

Atlantic Division

Southeast Division

South Central Division

Southwest Division

Pacific Division

Playoffs
It appears the USISL allowed each division to determine how its teams entered the playoffs.  In the Atlantic Division, the Richmond Kickers and Charleston Battery played a one-time game to determine who went to the division semifinals, despite the Kickers having six more points in the standings than the Battery.  In the Southeast Division, the Orlando Lions had a bye into the Sizzlin' Six Tournament as reigning champions.  Therefore, the next four teams entered the divisional semifinals.  In the Southwest Division, the top three teams qualified for the playoffs, but the next two teams did not enter.  Instead, the Valley Golden Eagles with a 3-13 record entered the divisional playoffs.  In the rest of the divisions, the top four teams made the divisional playoffs.

Atlantic Division

Play-in game

Semifinals
 Greensboro Dynamo 4, Richmond Kickers 1
 Delaware Wizards 4, Raleigh Flyers 2

Final
 Greensboro Dynamo defeated Delaware Wizards (5-0, 2-1)

Southeast Division

Semifinals
 Atlanta Lasers 3, Memphis Jackals 2
 Boca Raton Sabres 4, Coral Springs Kicks 1

Final
 Atlanta Lasers defeated Boca Raton Sabres (1-0, 3-2)

South Central Division

Semifinals

Final
 Dallas Rockets defeated Tulsa Roughnecks (4-3 (OT), 0-3, 1-0)

Southwest Division

Semifinals
 East Los Angeles Cobras 7, Montclair Standard Falcons 3 ( Ezzy Ihekoronye 4 goals)
 Valley Golden Eagles 5, El Paso Patriots 2

Final
  East Los Angeles Cobras defeated Valley Golden Eagles (0-6, 3-0, 2-0)
(Ezzy Ihekoronye East Los Angeles Cobras MVP)

Pacific Division

Semifinals
 San Jose Hawks 6, Chico Rooks 0
 San Francisco All Blacks 3, Palo Alto Firebirds 2 (OT)

Final
 San Jose Hawks 3, San Francisco All Blacks 0

Sizzlin' Six
As the defending champion, the Orlando Lions received a bye into the Sizzlin' Six Tournament.  The other five teams were the winners of the divisional playoffs.  The Sizzlin' Six Tournament began on Thursday, August 12.  The three teams in this tournament with the best regular seasons, the Orlando Lions, Greensboro Dynamo and San Jose Hawks, all had 14-2 records.  When they all won their games on Thursday, Friday's results became critical to choosing who would go to the championship game.  However, all three teams won again on Friday.  With all three teams having the same record, the tiebreaker went to goal differential.  The Greensboro Dynamo had a +13 goal differential, the Orlando Lions had a +6 and the San Jose Hawks had a +5.  This put the Dynamo and Lions in to the final.  All games were held at the Municipal Stadium, Daytona, Florida.

Thursday

Friday

Final

Points leaders

Honors
 MVP: Ed Radwanski
 Goals leader: Sheldon Lee
 Assists leader: Michael Araujo
 Goalkeeper of the Year: Vince Da Silva
 Coach of the Year:  Mark Dillon
 All League
Goalkeeper: Vince Da Silva
Defenders: Michael Ditta, David Ulmstein, Derek Van Rheenen
Midfielders: Patrick Krehl, Ed Radwanski, Jason Haupt
Forwards: Sheldon Lee, David Mackey, Justin Wall, Mike Gailey

References

External links
United Soccer Leagues (RSSSF)
The Year in American Soccer – 1993

USISL outdoor seasons (1989–1994)
2